Livia Bitton-Jackson (born February 28, 1931) is an author and a Holocaust survivor. 
She was born as Elli L. Friedmann in Samorin, Czechoslovakia, She was 13 years old when she, her mother, father, aunt and brother Bubi, were taken to Ghetto Nagymagyar. Eventually, they were transported to Auschwitz, the largest German concentration camp, where her brother and aunt were separated from Livia and her mother. Her aunt perished but her brother survived. She, her mother and brother were liberated in 1945. Bitton-Jackson came to the U.S. on a refugee boat in 1951 to join Bubi, who was studying in New York. She then studied at New York University, from which she received a Ph.D. in Hebrew Culture and Jewish History. She also wrote her 1997 memoir I Have Lived a Thousand Years.

Early life
Elli was born in Samorin, on February 28, 1931, the second child to Laura and Markus Friedmann, but in 1938, Hungarian troops occupied Samorin, renaming it Somorja. In Somorja, the segregation of Jews began rapidly when the Germans invaded Hungary in 1944. Jews were prohibited from entering theaters, restaurants, grocery stores, and other public places. Two months into the German occupation, all the Jews in that area were moved to Ghetto Nagymagyar. Two weeks after her father was taken, Bitton-Jackson, her aunt, mother, and brother were removed from the ghetto and taken to Dunajska Streda, a town in Slovakia and then to Auschwitz, the largest concentration camp built by the Germans in occupied Poland. She and her mother stayed there for ten days. In June 1944, Bitton-Jackson and her mother were transferred, along with 500 other women, to Plaszow, a forced labor camp near Kraków. There, their work consisted of planierung - leveling off a hilltop in preparation for construction. If they did not work properly, or violated any rule, they would be beaten by their Kapo or his assistants. After two months at Plaszow, they returned to Auschwitz. She was 13 at the time.

Germany
In August 1944, Bitton-Jackson and her mother were taken from Auschwitz to a factory in the German city of Augsburg. In Augsburg, she was put to work in an assembly line in the factory, where they produced a "precision instrument that is supposed to control the distance and direction of the bomb ejected by a fighter plane". They stayed until April 1945. After this she and her mother were taken to a subsidiary camp of Dachau, in Germany, where she was reunited with her older brother Bubi, who was staying in the men's camp. Her stay here was shortened due to the Allies advance and the three surviving members of the family were taken by trains further into Germany. On the way, the guards deserted and many of the prisoners mistook this to be the liberation. However, the guards returned and fired upon those who had left the train, and ordered the others back onto the carriages. During the rest of the journey, Bitton-Jackson was able to keep her brother with herself and her mother. At one point, she spotted through the cracks in the carriage Red Cross trucks, and the soldiers informed them that the charity would be giving out food. The surviving inmates lined up close to the carriage entrance whereupon they were shot at by the SS. Bubi received a shot to the forehead, but survived. It was only after a week of traveling that the Americans discovered the trains full of dead, injured and starving inmates.

After the liberation, Bitton-Jackson, her mother and brother stayed in Seeshaupt where she helped to nurse her brother and fellow inmates back to health.

New York
After the war, she and her brother and mother returned to Šamorín, believing that her father would be waiting for them, only to discover that he was dead. Her brother then moved to New York on a visa from a school scholarship. Bitton-Jackson had the opportunity to go with her brother but chose to stay in Czechoslovakia with her mother. The two stayed in Šamorín until 1951, when they finally got visas to go to America.

They traveled to America on a refugee boat, and Bitton-Jackson continued her education. She eventually enrolled in New York University, and got a degree there. Bitton-Jackson has a Ph.D. in Hebrew Culture and Jewish History obtained at New York University. She has been a professor of history at City University of New York for 37 years, and has won numerous awards, including the 1998 Christopher Award for her book, I Have Lived a Thousand Years.

Israel
In 1977, Bitton-Jackson moved to Israel, where she has been living ever since. She continued teaching at CUNY for years thereafter, and still makes periodic trips to the U.S. for speaking engagements. In April 2009, Bitton-Jackson was invited to speak in 
Omaha, Nebraska, for Holocaust Remembrance Day at the Durham Museum, with videolinks to Pleasanton and at Millard West High School. She also spoke to members of the Strategic Air Command at Offutt AFB.

Publications
 I Have Lived a Thousand Years
 My Bridges of Hope
 Hello, America
 Saving What Remains

References

1930s births
Living people
20th-century American memoirists
20th-century American women writers
Czechoslovak emigrants to the United States
American people of Czech-Jewish descent
Jewish concentration camp survivors
New York University alumni
Auschwitz concentration camp survivors
21st-century American women